KZZA (106.7 MHz "La Ranchera 106.7 FM/1540 AM") is a commercial FM radio station licensed to Muenster, Texas, and serving northern communities in the Dallas-Ft. Worth Metroplex.  It is owned by Estrella Media and it broadcasts a Classic Regional Mexican radio format, which is simulcast on co-owned KZMP 1540 AM.

KZZA has an effective radiated power (ERP) of 75,000 watts.  The transmitter is off Farm-to-Market Road 730 North in Rosston, Texas.

History

Oldies and Dance
The station signed on the air on September 9, 1990, at 106.5 MHz.  It had the call sign KXGM and aired an oldies format.  In 2001, it moved to 106.7 and was sold to Entravision. However, in exchange for the move it was agreed with HBC that it would not change to a Spanish-language format for five years.

On August 14, 2002 it launched another English-language format, Dance Top 40, as KKDL (106.7 KDL)  It used the slogans "The Dance Leader" and later, "The Texas Party Station."

"Casa" Rhythmic Contemporary
On February 16, 2005, it moved in a bilingual rhythmic contemporary direction as KZZA, "CASA 106.7", in an attempt to target a younger 18-34 audience, mostly third-generation Hispanics. At first, its musical direction focused more along the lines of a typical rhythmic direction.  But by 2006, KZZA began leaning more towards "Hurban" product and less dependent on traditional rhythmic fare, resulting in the station going "Hurban" full-time.

On August 4, 2006, Liberman Broadcasting bought five radio stations including KZZA from Entravision Communications.

After a year of 'Urban' programming and trying to challenge rival KFZO, KZZA began to shift back to a more conventional rhythmic direction. As a result of this, R&R and BDS moved KZZA back to their rhythmic panels in May 2007. With that move, Casa 106.7 was marketed under the slogan "Hip-Hop Y Mas".

Of all the contemporary music stations in the Dallas-Fort Worth radio market, KZZA was the only one that featured club mix shows every night of the week, unlike competitors, which relegated mix shows to the weekends.

On July 7, 2008 the station shifted back to Hispanic Rhythmic, leaving only Radio One's KBFB as the only rhythmic station in Dallas/Fort Worth. Although Casa 106.7 was broadcasting on a rimshot frequency, it has created a loyal following with English and Spanish-speaking listeners throughout a five-year run.

Classic Regional Mexican
On April 6, 2009, the station again switched formats, this time to Spanish language Classic Regional Mexican music as "La Bonita 106.7."  The station featured host Ermilo Obiedo every morning from 7am to 1pm. The rest of the programming ran with no disc jockeys. This was due to KEGL changing formats back to active rock in 2007.

On September 4, 2016, Liberman Broadcasting kept the same format but under a new name as "La Ranchera 106.7".  Liberman uses the "La Ranchera" name for other Classic Regional Mexican stations in its portfolio.  From the time of the rebranding until 2018 and again in September 2019, KZZA simulcasts with its AM sister station KZMP 1540 AM.

Slogans

 The Dance Leader (2002-2003)
 The Texas Party Station (2003-2004)
 Where Latinos Live. (2004-2007)
 Where Reggaeton Lives. (2006-2007)
 Hip-Hop Y Mas. (2007)
 DF Dub's Party Station (2007-2008)
 Viejitas pero bonitas  (2008-2016)
 La Ranchera Me Gusta Mas!  (2016–present)

Signal
Unlike most of the area's FM stations (such as competitors KLNO and KMVK), which transmit their signals from Cedar Hill, KZZA transmits its signal from an unincorporated area within the county borders of Cooke, Montague, and Wise. Therefore, KZZA's signal is much stronger in the Northwestern parts of the Dallas/Fort Worth metroplex as well as the cities of Decatur, Bowie, Gainesville, and Sherman, to as far north as Ardmore, Oklahoma, but is considerably weaker in Dallas and areas Southeast of the city itself.

References

External links
La Ranchera 106.7 - official website

 DFW Radio Archives
 DFW radio/TV history

Regional Mexican radio stations in the United States
ZZA
Radio stations established in 1990
Estrella Media stations